Sha'b al-Muraysi is a sub-district located in al-Nadirah District, Ibb Governorate, Yemen. Sha'b al-Muraysi had a population of 5257 according to the 2004 census.

References 

Sub-districts in An Nadirah District